Dionisio Fernández (born 1921) was an Argentine sports shooter. He competed in the 25 m pistol event at the 1948 Summer Olympics.

References

External links
 

1921 births
Possibly living people
Argentine male sport shooters
Olympic shooters of Argentina
Shooters at the 1948 Summer Olympics
Place of birth missing
Pan American Games medalists in shooting
Pan American Games gold medalists for Argentina
Shooters at the 1951 Pan American Games
Medalists at the 1951 Pan American Games